The scarlet-breasted fruit dove (Ptilinopus bernsteinii) is a species of bird in the family Columbidae. It is endemic to Indonesia, where it occurs in the northern Moluccas. Its natural habitat is subtropical or tropical moist lowland forests. It is rated as a species of least concern on the International Union for Conservation of Nature Red List of Endangered Species. In 1863 Hermann Schlegel named the new species for one of his collectors, Heinrich Agathon Bernstein.

Description 
It has a grey head which has a green wash. The rest of the upperparts and breast are bright green in colour. The male is patched with bright scarlet, at the middle of the lower breast. It has an orange-yellow belly, and chestnut undertail coverts. The underwing coverts are also orange-yellow.

Behaviour and ecology 
It is presumably a frugivorous species. It is normally quiet, and has been described to emit deep, soft  calls. It also emits odd growling calls. It usually quietly forages alone or in pairs, in forest canopies.

Status and conservation 
Since 1988, the scarlet-breasted fruit dove has been rated as a species of least concern on the IUCN Red List of Endangered Species. This is because although it has a restricted range, the range size is more than 20,000 km2 (7,700 mi2) with a stable population trend. In addition, although its population numbers have not been determined, it is thought to be above 10,000, which does not meet the criterion to warrant a vulnerable rating. The species is described as "uncommon to moderately common", and there is no evidence of major threat to their population.

References

External links

 Oriental Bird Images: Scarlet-breasted Fruit Dove  Selected images

scarlet-breasted fruit dove
Birds of the Maluku Islands
scarlet-breasted fruit dove
Taxonomy articles created by Polbot
Taxobox binomials not recognized by IUCN